Aniruddh Singh is an Indian television actor. Currently, he played the role of Dr. Anurag Arora in Sasural Simar Ka on Colors TV.

Career
Aniruddh made his television debut with Chhajje Chhajje Ka Pyaar as Daksh Tripathi on Sony TV. He also appeared in Mann Kee Awaaz Pratigya as Adarsh Saxena and Saraswatichandra as Sunny. He also played a negative role in Hum Ne Li Hai- Shapath as Tamas- a scientist

Television
2007 Khwaish as riaz zardari
2011 Chhajje Chhajje Ka Pyaar as Daksh Tripathi
2011–2012 Mann Kee Awaaz Pratigya as Adarsh Saxena
2013 Saraswatichandra as Sunny
2013 Hum Ne Li Hai- Shapath as Tamas- a scientist
2014;15 Sasural Simar Ka as Dr. Anurag Arora

References

External links

Living people
Indian male soap opera actors
Indian male television actors
Year of birth missing (living people)
Place of birth missing (living people)